National Peace Council of Ghana -  The National Peace Council (NPC) is an independent statutory national peace institution established by the eight hundred and eighteenth (818) Act of the Parliament of the Republic of Ghana, named The National Peace Council Act, 2011. Thus any activity undertaken by the Council must be derived from its mandate under Act 818. The core function of the Council is to prevent, manage, and resolve conflict and to build sustainable peace.

With the passing of Act 818, NPC became operational in 2011. Its establishment abolished the previous peace strategy of National, Regional and District Security Councils that established Regional Peace Advisory Councils (RPACs) and District Peace Advisory Councils (DPACs).

The National Peace Council consists at the national level of a governing body known as the Board of thirteen eminent persons appointed by the President. The appointment is for a period of four years but a Board member may resign or membership may be revoked by the President for stated reasons. There is also an Executive Secretary appointed by the President, responsible for day to day administration of the affairs of the Council.

At the Regional and District Levels, the NPC consists of Regional and District Peace Councils appointed by the Board in consultation with the Regional coordinating Council and the District Assembly respectively. There are also Regional and District Executive Secretaries appointed by the President.

Notable actions 
 Pleading for Kwadwo Owusu Afriyie before the Supreme Court of Ghana.

References 

Ministries and Agencies of State of Ghana